Eastern sigillata C, also known as Çandarli ware, is a category of Late Hellenistic and Roman terra sigillata. The best known production center is at Çandarlı, ancient Pitane.

See also
 Eastern sigillata A (ESA)
 Eastern sigillata B (ESB)
 Eastern sigillata D (ESD)

Bibliography
 Hayes, John. (1972). Late Roman Pottery. London: British School at Rome (hardcover).
 Hayes, John. (1985). Sigillate Oriental in Enciclopedia dell'arte antica classica e orientale. Atlante delle Forme Ceramiche II, Ceramica Fine Romana nel Bacino Mediterraneo (Tardo Ellenismo e Primo Impero), Rome.
 Heath, Sebastian and Billur Tekkök. (2007-). Eastern Sigillata C (Çandarli) in Greek, Roman and Byzantine Pottery at Ilion (Troia). <http://classics.uc.edu/troy/grbpottery/html/esc.html>.
 Loeschke, S. (1912). Sigillata-Töpfereien in Çandarlı, Athenische Mitteilungen 37, pp. 344–407.

References

Ancient Roman pottery